Ida Bjørndalen Karlsson (born 6 May 1983) is a former Norwegian handball player, who last played for Team Esbjerg. She made her debut for the Norwegian national team in 2004. She won the Champions League with Viborg HK in 2009. She had initially announced her retirement with the conclusion of the 2016–17 season but changed her mind.

Individual awards
Danish Handball League Top Scorer: 2018

References

1983 births
Living people
Norwegian female handball players
People from Sarpsborg
Sportspeople from Viken (county)